= SA Army Troop Information Unit =

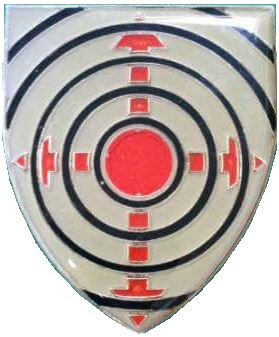
- SA Army Troop Information Unit emblem SA Army Troop Information Unit emblem
- Country: South Africa
- Allegiance: Republic of South Africa
- Branch: South African Army
- Type: COMOPS
- Role: Communications for Operations
- Part of: South African Intelligence Corps; Army Conventional Reserve
- Garrison/HQ: Johannesburg

SA Army Troop Information Unit was a South African Army Intelligence Corps COMOPS (Note: Communications Operations also known as PSYOPS) unit, utilizing conscripts who had completed university or worked in a professional capacity as camera operators, freelance journalists, photographers, public relations officers and journalists from practically every newspaper in South Africa. The unit drew upon these specialist skills and professions, providing staff to the State run broadcasting service, the South African Broadcasting Corporation. The personnel undertook their two year military service within this non-military institution as a media centre where a paper war was being played out.
